The 2019 Hong Kong Women's Sevens acts as a qualifier for the 2019–20 World Rugby Women's Sevens Series. The tournament was played on 4 April 2019 with pool stage matches played at So Kon Po Recreation Ground with knock-out stage matches played at the Hong Kong Stadium in Hong Kong alongside the 2019 Hong Kong Sevens for men.

Continental qualifying 

Teams will qualify for the World Series Qualifier tournament based on continental championships. The top teams from each continent that are not already core teams will qualify.

Format
12 teams, split into three groups of four. The group winners, runners up and the two best third ranked teams will enter the knockout stage. The overall winner will gain a spot on the 2019–20 World Rugby Women's Sevens Series.

Pool Stage
All times in Hong Kong Time (UTC+08:00).

Pool A

Pool B

Pool C

Knockout stage

See also
2019 Hong Kong Sevens
2018-19 World Rugby Women's Sevens Series

References

External links
 Tournament page
 World Rugby page

2019
2018–19 World Rugby Women's Sevens Series
2019 rugby sevens competitions
2019 in women's rugby union
Rugby union
2019 in Asian rugby union
Hong Kong Women's Sevens